A Burning in Homeland is the first novel by Richard Yancey.  Published in 2003 by Simon & Schuster, it uses three characters to tell a story of a murder in a small town following a parsonage fire.

2003 American novels
English-language novels
2003 debut novels